Zahid Hameed (born 1 August 1985) is a Pakistani footballer, who plays for Aqua Water as a midfielder. Hameed previously played for WAPDA, winning five league titles with them, including 2003 National Football Championship.

Hameed earned his first international cap during the World Cup qualifiers in 2003 and scored his first goal in the 2008 AFC Challenge Cup qualifiers. Due to Muhammad Essa's injury, Hameed was named Pakistan national team captain for SAFF Cup 2008.

International Career Stats

Goals for Senior National Team

Honours

Club
WAPDA
 National Football Championship / Pakistan Premier League: 2003, 2004–05, 2007–08, 2008–09, 2010–11

International
South Asian Games: 2004, 2006

References

1985 births
Living people
Pakistani footballers
Pakistan international footballers
WAPDA F.C. players
Footballers at the 2006 Asian Games
Association football midfielders
South Asian Games gold medalists for Pakistan
Asian Games competitors for Pakistan
South Asian Games medalists in football
21st-century Pakistani people